Skye Amiel Blakely (born February 4, 2005) is an American artistic gymnast.  She was a member of the teams who won gold at the 2022 World Championships, silver at the 2022 Pan American Championships, and bronze at the inaugural Junior World Championships.  She is the younger sister of gymnast Sloane Blakely.

Early life 
Blakely was born to  Steven and Stephanie Blakely in 2005 in Dallas, Texas and has one sibling.

Gymnastics career

Junior Elite

2018 
In early 2018 Blakely competed at the Buckeye National Qualifier and the WOGA Classic, where she placed sixth in the all-around.  She later competed at International Gymnix where she placed fifteenth in the all-around and fifth on uneven bars.  In early July, she competed at the American Classic where she placed third in the all-around behind Kayla DiCello and Konnor McClain.  Later that month she competed at the 2018 U.S. Classic where she placed sixth in the all-around and third on vault.  In August Blakely competed at the 2018 U.S. National Gymnastics Championships.  She finished in fourth place in the all-around behind Leanne Wong, DiCello, and Sunisa Lee and won silver on floor exercise and bronze on vault.  As a result she was added to the national team for the first time.

2019 
In February Blakely was named to the team to compete at 2019 L'International Gymnix in Montreal, alongside Olivia Greaves, Lillian Lippeatt, and Kaylen Morgan.  While there she helped the USA win team gold and individually she won bronze in the all-around behind Canadian Zoé Allaire-Bourgie and teammate Greaves.  During event finals she won gold on vault and uneven bars.

In June Blakely competed at the Junior World Championships Trials where she placed first in the all-around and was named to the team to compete at the inaugural Junior World Championships alongside Kayla DiCello and Sydney Barros.  While there she helped the USA win team bronze and individually she recorded the seventh highest all-around score but did not place due to DiCello and Barros both placing higher.  During event finals she placed fourth on uneven bars and fifth on floor exercise.

In July Blakely competed at the U.S. Classic where she placed fourth in the all-around behind Konnor McClain, Barros, and Greaves.  She won gold on floor exercise and silver on vault.

In August Blakely competed at the U.S. National Championships where she placed fourth in the all-around.  She tied for second on balance beam with Ciena Alipio and behind McClain and won bronze on floor exercise. As a result she was added to the junior national team.

2020 
Blakely competed at the WOGA Classic in February, earning an all-around score of 57.150 to place first in the junior division and outscoring the senior division as well.  In March Blakely was selected to compete at International Gymnix, taking place in Montreal alongside Konnor McClain, Kaliya Lincoln, and Katelyn Jong.  While there she helped the USA win team gold and individually she won gold in the all-around, silver on vault, uneven bars, and balance beam behind McClain, and bronze on floor exercise behind McClain and Bailey Inglis of Canada.

Senior elite

2021 
Blakely made her senior debut at the 2021 Winter Cup, finishing first on balance beam and tied for eighth on floor exercise with Amari Drayton.  She next competed at the American Classic where she placed first in the all-around.  As a result of winning, she was re-added to the national team.  Blakely next competed at the GK US Classic, placing seventh in the all-around, as well as finishing third on uneven bars behind Kayla DiCello and Jordan Chiles.  At the National Championships Blakely finished seventh in the all-around.  As a result, she was named to the national team and selected to compete at the upcoming Olympic Trials.  At the Olympic Trials Blakely was injured during vault warmups and withdrew from both nights of competition.

In September Blakely verbally committed to compete for the Florida Gators.

2022 
Blakely returned to competition at the 2022 Winter Cup where she placed second in the all-around competition behind Konnor McClain.  As a result she was selected to compete at the upcoming DTB Pokal Team Challenge in Stuttgart alongside McClain, eMjae Frazier, Nola Matthews, and Ashlee Sullivan.  As a team they placed first.  In July she was selected to compete at the upcoming Pan American Championships alongside Kayla DiCello, Zoe Miller, Elle Mueller, and Lexi Zeiss.  On the first day of competition she won bronze in the all-around behind Flávia Saraiva of Brazil and teammate Zeiss and also on floor exercise behind DiCello and Saraiva.  Additionally she placed fourth on uneven bars and seventh on balance beam. During the team final Blakely competed on all four events helping the United States win silver behind Brazil.

In October Blakely was selected to compete at the 2022 World Championships alongside Jade Carey, Jordan Chiles, Shilese Jones, and Leanne Wong, and traveling alternate Lexi Zeiss.  During the qualification round Blakely helped the USA qualify to the team final in first place.  Individually she qualified to the balance beam final in second place behind Ou Yushan of China.  During the team final Blakely competed on the balance beam, helping the USA win their sixth consecutive team gold medal.  During event finals Blakely placed fifth on balance beam after falling off the apparatus.

In November Blakely officially signed her National Letter of Intent with the Florida Gators with the intention of deferring enrollment until after the 2024 Olympic Games.

Competitive history

References

External links
 
 

2005 births
Living people
African-American female gymnasts
American female artistic gymnasts
Medalists at the Junior World Artistic Gymnastics Championships
Medalists at the World Artistic Gymnastics Championships
U.S. women's national team gymnasts
Sportspeople from Dallas
Gymnasts from Texas
People from Frisco, Texas
21st-century African-American sportspeople
21st-century African-American women